Augustus (Gus) George Frederic James KC (30 October 1866 – 27 February 1934) was an Australian politician. He was the Liberal/Nationalist member for Goulburn in the New South Wales Legislative Assembly from 1907 to 1920.

James served as Minister of Public Instruction in the Holman Nationalist ministry from November 1916 to April 1920, adding the portfolio of Labour and Industry from July 1919. James was appointed King's Counsel on 29 October 1919.

He was appointed an Acting Judge of the Supreme Court of New South Wales on 21 September 1920 for six months and a Puisne Judge on 5 January 1921.

He had married Altona Johanna Bohrsmann on 17 August 1892 and they had five children, 3 daughters and 2 sons.

References

 

1866 births
1934 deaths
Members of the New South Wales Legislative Assembly
Nationalist Party of Australia members of the Parliament of New South Wales
Australian King's Counsel
Judges of the Supreme Court of New South Wales